The women's javelin throw at the 2017 World Championships in Athletics was held at the Olympic Stadium on 6 and 8 August.

Summary
Olympic gold medalist Sara Kolak's second throw took the lead at 64.95 metres. Her lead lasted only two throws before world record holder, at age 36, Barbora Špotáková threw , which turned out to be the winner. These were two of six throwers who achieved their best distance in the second round. Li Lingwei's personal best 66.25 metres near the end of the third round put her in second place. With the benefit of those three extra throws, Lü threw a 65.26m in the fifth round to take the bronze medal from Kolak. She was the only competitor to improve her position in the final three throws.

Records
Before the competition records were as follows:

The following records were set at the competition:

Qualification standard
The standard to qualify automatically for entry was 61.40 metres.

Schedule
The event schedule, in local time (UTC+1), was as follows:

Results

Qualification
The qualification round took place on 6 August, in two groups, with Group A starting at 19:05 and Group B starting at 20:29. Athletes attaining a mark of at least 63.50 metres( Q ) or at least the 12 best performers ( q ) qualified for the final. The overall results were as follows:

Final
The final took place on 8 August at 19:20. The results were as follows:

References

Javelin throw
Javelin throw at the World Athletics Championships